Krisztián is a given name. Notable people with the name include:

Krisztián Adorján (born 1993), Hungarian footballer
Krisztián Bártfai (born 1974), Hungarian sprint canoeist
Krisztián Berki (born 1985), Hungarian artistic gymnast
Krisztián Carrasco (born 1981), Hungarian attorney
Krisztián Csillag (born 1975), Hungarian footballer
Krisztián Éder (born 1988), Hungarian singer/rapper
Krisztián Füzi (born 1975), Hungarian football player
Krisztián Futaki (born 1979), Hungarian football (defender) player
Krisztián Kenesei (born 1977), Hungarian football player
Krisztián Kulcsár (born 1971), Hungarian fencer, winner of two Olympic silver medals
Krisztián Lisztes (born 1976), Hungarian professional footballer
Krisztián Németh (born 1989), Hungarian international football player
Krisztián Pars (born 1982), Hungarian hammer thrower
Krisztián Pest (born 1975), Hungarian football player
Krisztián Sárneczky (born 1974), Hungarian amateur astronomer
Krisztián Simon (born 1991), Hungarian footballer
Krisztián Szollár (born 1980), Hungarian football player
Krisztián Timár (born 1979), Hungarian footballer
Krisztián Ungváry (born 1969), Hungarian historian of 20th century political and military history
Krisztián Vadócz (born 1985), Hungarian professional footballer
Krisztián Veréb (born 1977), Hungarian sprint canoeist
Krisztián Vermes (born 1985), Hungarian footballer
Krisztián Wittmann (born 1985), Hungarian basketball player
Krisztián Zahorecz (1975–2019), Hungarian football player

See also
Christian (given name)

Masculine given names
Hungarian masculine given names